Gonçalo Alexandre Silva Duarte (born 11 July 1997) is a Portuguese footballer who plays for C.S. Marítimo Sub-23, as a defender.

Club career
On 23 August 2017, Duarte made his professional debut with Gil Vicente in a 2017–18 LigaPro match against União Madeira.

References

External links

1997 births
People from Moita
Living people
Portuguese footballers
Portugal youth international footballers
Association football defenders
G.D. Fabril players
F.C. Barreirense players
Vitória F.C. players
Gil Vicente F.C. players
Liga Portugal 2 players
Campeonato de Portugal (league) players
Sportspeople from Setúbal District